{{DISPLAYTITLE:C7H6O3}}
The molecular formula C7H6O3 may refer to:

 Monohydroxybenzoic acids
 2-Hydroxybenzoic acid (salicylic acid)
 3-Hydroxybenzoic acid
 4-Hydroxybenzoic acid
 Peroxybenzoic acid
 Protocatechuic aldehyde
 Sesamol